It's Christmas is the second studio album and first Christmas album from contemporary Christian singer Mandisa, released on October 14, 2008.  As of November 2012, the album has sold 53,000 copies.

Track listing

Charts

References

2008 Christmas albums
Christmas albums by American artists
Mandisa albums
Sparrow Records albums